Limosilactobacillus is a thermophilic and heterofermentative genus of lactic acid bacteria created in 2020 by splitting from Lactobacillus. The name is derived from the Latin  "slimy", referring to the property of most strains in the genus to produce exopolysaccharides from sucrose. The genus currently includes 31 species or subspecies, most of these were isolated from the intestinal tract of humans or animals. Limosilactobacillus reuteri has been used as a model organism to evaluate the host-adaptation of lactobacilli to the human and animal intestine  and for the recruitment of intestinal lactobacilli for food fermentations.

Limosilactobacilli are heterofermentative and produce lactate, CO2, and acetate or ethanol from glucose; several limosilactobacilli, particularly strains of Lm. reuteri convert glycerol or 1,2-propanediol to 1,3 propanediol or propanol, respectively. Most strains do not grow in presence of oxygen, or in de Man, Rogosa Sharpe (MRS) medium, the standard medium for cultivation of lactobacilli. Addition of maltose, cysteine and fructose to MRS is usually sufficient for cultivation of limosilactobacilli.

Species
The genus Limosilactobacillus comprises the following species:
 Limosilactobacillus agrestis Li et al. 2021
 Limosilactobacillus albertensis Li et al. 2021
 Limosilactobacillus alvi Zheng et al. 2020
 Limosilactobacillus antri (Roos et al. 2005) Zheng et al. 2020
 Limosilactobacillus balticus Li et al. 2021
 Limosilactobacillus caviae (Killer et al. 2017) Zheng et al. 2020
 Limosilactobacillus coleohominis (Nikolaitchouk et al. 2001) Zheng et al. 2020
 Limosilactobacillus equigenerosi (Endo et al. 2008) Zheng et al. 2020
 Limosilactobacillus fastidiosus Li et al. 2021
 Limosilactobacillus fermentum (Beijerinck 1901) Zheng et al. 2020
 Limosilactobacillus frumenti (Müller et al. 2000) Zheng et al. 2020
 Limosilactobacillus gastricus (Roos et al. 2005) Zheng et al. 2020
 Limosilactobacillus gorillae (Tsuchida et al. 2014) Zheng et al. 2020
 Limosilactobacillus ingluviei (Baele et al. 2003) Zheng et al. 2020
 Limosilactobacillus mucosae (Roos et al. 2000) Zheng et al. 2020
 Limosilactobacillus oris (Farrow and Collins 1988) Zheng et al. 2020
 Limosilactobacillus panis (Wiese et al. 1996) Zheng et al. 2020
 Limosilactobacillus pontis (Vogel et al. 1994) Zheng et al. 2020
 Limosilactobacillus portuensis Ksiezarek et al. 2021
 Limosilactobacillus reuteri (Kandler et al. 1982) Zheng et al. 2020
 Limosilactobacillus rudii Li et al. 2021
 Limosilactobacillus secaliphilus (Ehrmann et al. 2007) Zheng et al. 2020
 Limosilactobacillus urinaemulieris Ksiezarek et al. 2021
 Limosilactobacillus vaginalis (Embley et al. 1989) Zheng et al. 2020

Phylogeny
The currently accepted taxonomy is based on the List of Prokaryotic names with Standing in Nomenclature and the phylogeny is based on whole-genome sequences.

References 

Lactobacillaceae
Food science
Gut flora bacteria
Garde manger
Gram-positive bacteria
Bacteria genera